Jen Bartlett (born Jen Edmondson) was a former tennis player and an Australian filmmaker who worked on nature documentary series such as Survivors of the Skeleton Coast.

In 1959 she married a fellow filmmaker Des Bartlett. The couple lived on the Skeleton Coast, southwest coast of Namibia, for nine years while filming for the National Geographic. They were jointly awarded the Royal Geographical Society's Cherry Kearton Medal and Award in 1974.

Works
 Flight of the Snow Geese (1972)

References

External links 
 
 Jen Bartlett's WildFilmHistory bio
 Survivors of the Skeleton Coast

Place of birth missing (living people)
Year of birth missing (living people)
British film directors
Living people